Leptosia bastini is a butterfly in the family Pieridae. It is found in the Central African Republic and south-eastern Cameroon. The habitat consists of forests.

References

Butterflies described in 1997
bastini